Southeast Powell Boulevard is a light rail station on the MAX Green Line in Portland, Oregon. It is the 3rd stop southbound on the I-205 MAX branch.

The station is located off of SE 92nd Avenue and Powell Boulevard. It is adjacent to Interstate 205, and offers connections to the I-205 Bike Path. This station has a center platform, and is surrounded by a park-and-ride facility.

Bus line connections
This station is served by the following bus lines:
9 - Powell Blvd

External links
Station information (with northbound ID number) from TriMet
Station information (with southbound ID number) from TriMet
MAX Light Rail Stations – more general TriMet page
Park & Ride Locations – TriMet page

MAX Light Rail stations
MAX Green Line
2009 establishments in Oregon
Railway stations in the United States opened in 2009
Railway stations in Portland, Oregon